"Se Necesita Un Milagro" (English: A Miracle Is Needed) is a song by Puerto Rican-American recording artist Domingo Quiñones, from his fourth studio album, by the same name. It features a rap performed by Puerto Rican reggaeton recording artist Ivy Queen.

The song was relatively successful compared to the previous two singles from the album, "No Voy A Dejarte Ir" and "Si Puediera Volver A Verte". It reached number twenty-eight on the Billboard Latin Songs chart and number eight on the Billboard Tropical Songs chart. It was recognized at the American Society of Composers, Authors and Publishers Latin Awards of 1999 in the salsa field.

Track listing

Chart performance

References

1998 singles
1997 songs
Spanish-language songs
Ivy Queen songs
Salsa songs
Songs about Puerto Rico
Domingo Quiñones songs